Gary Paul Lucas (born November 8, 1954) is an American former professional baseball pitcher who pitched in Major League Baseball (MLB) with the San Diego Padres (1980–83), Montreal Expos (1984–85) and California Angels (1986–87).

Career

Playing career
Lucas was drafted by the Cincinnati Reds in the 1st round of the 1973 amateur draft. He failed to come to terms with the Reds on a contract and became re-eligible for the draft, subsequently being selected by the San Diego Padres in the 19th round of the 1976 amateur draft.

Lucas made his major league debut on April 16, 1980, pitching one relief inning in a Padres' loss to the Los Angeles Dodgers. He was used as a starting pitcher for much of his rookie season before being used exclusively as a reliever for the remainder of his major league career. In 1981, Lucas led all National League pitchers by appearing in 57 games. In his final major league appearance, Lucas pitched  innings of scoreless work to close out a Jack Lazorko win for the California Angels on October 3, 1987.

In eight major league seasons, he posted a career record of 29–44 with 63 saves and a 3.01 ERA in 669 innings.

Coaching career
Lucas has served as a pitching coach for a variety of minor league baseball teams. He was the pitching coach with the Wisconsin Timber Rattlers, the Milwaukee Brewers' Class-A team in 2015 before spending the following two seasons as a coach with the Class-AA New Britain Rock Cats. Wanting to be closer to his home in Rice Lake, Wisconsin, Lucas asked to be reassigned back to Beloit, where he remained through 2012, when the Twins moved their Midwest League team to Cedar Rapids. Lucas spent one year in Cedar Rapids, before being moved to the Twins High-A franchise, the Fort Myers Miracle in 2014. Lucas was dismissed by the Twins following the 2014 season.

References

External links

1954 births
Living people
Amarillo Gold Sox players
American expatriate baseball players in Canada
Baseball coaches from California
Baseball players from California
California Angels players
Chapman Panthers baseball players
Hawaii Islanders players
Indianapolis Indians players
Major League Baseball pitchers
Montreal Expos players
Palm Springs Angels players
People from Rice Lake, Wisconsin
Phoenix Firebirds players
Reno Silver Sox players
Riverside City Tigers baseball coaches
Riverside City Tigers baseball players
San Diego Padres players
Walla Walla Padres players
West Palm Beach Expos players
Peninsula Oilers players
Riverside Polytechnic High School alumni